Costas Constantinou may refer to:
 Costas Constantinou (Scouting)
 Costas Constantinou (politician), member of the Cypriot House of Representatives
 Costas Constantinou (runner)
 Costas Constantinou (footballer)
 Costas Constantinou (darts) professional darts player